Hesquiat Lake Provincial Park is a provincial park located on the west coast of Vancouver Island in British Columbia, Canada. It was established on April 5, 2001 to mature coastal forests of Western hemlock, western red cedar and lodgepole pine along the eastern shores of Hesquiat Lake.

See also
Clayoquot Sound Biosphere Reserve
Hesquiat Peninsula Provincial Park

References

Clayoquot Sound region
Provincial parks of British Columbia
Year of establishment missing